Lesa is a comune (municipality) in the Province of Novara in the Italian region of Piedmont, located about  northeast of Turin and about  north of Novara.   

Lesa borders the following municipalities: Belgirate, Brovello-Carpugnino, Ispra, Massino Visconti, Meina, Nebbiuno, Ranco, and Stresa.

References

External links

Official website

Cities and towns in Piedmont